ipcs is a Unix and Linux command to list System V InterProcess Communication System's API kernel entities to stdout.
System V IPC kernel entities are:
Shared memory segments
Message queues
Semaphore arrays

Implementations
On Linux, the  command is provided by the util-linux package.

The  command has also been ported to the IBM i operating system.

See also
List of Unix commands
ipcrm

References

External links

Unix SUS2008 utilities
IBM i Qshell commands